S23 may refer to:

Rail and transit 
 S23 (Long Island bus), in New York, United States
 S23 (Rhine-Ruhr S-Bahn), in Germany
 Kita-Tatsumi Station, in Ikuno-ku, Osaka, Japan
 Kutchan Station, in Hokkaido, Japan

Submarines 
 
 , of the Royal Navy
 , of the Indian Navy
 , of the Indian Navy
 , of the United States Navy

Other uses 
 S-23 (drug), an investigational selective androgen receptor modulator
 180 mm gun S-23, a Soviet heavy gun
 40S ribosomal protein S23
 British NVC community S23, a swamps and tall-herb fens community in the British National Vegetation Classification system
 Patent Reform Act of 2011, a bill introduced in the 112th United States Congress
 S23: Do not breathe gas/fumes/vapour/spray (appropriate wording to be specified by the manufacturer), a safety phrase
 Short S.23, a British flying boat
 Sikorsky S-23, a Russian biplane bomber
 Samsung Galaxy S23, an Android smartphone series by Samsung Electronics